Charntay Poko (born 10 November 1995) is a New Zealand rugby league and union footballer. She previously played for the New Zealand Warriors and Newcastle Knights in the NRL Women's Premiership.

Background
Born in Auckland, Poko is of Cook Island descent.

Rugby career

Rugby league 
Poko played for the Papanui Tigers in the Canterbury Rugby League competition and represented Canterbury in both rugby league and rugby union. In 2016, she was named in the New Zealand wider squad.

In 2019, Poko began playing for the Richmond Roses in the Auckland Rugby League.

On 10 July 2019, Poko joined the New Zealand Warriors NRL Women's Premiership team. In Round 1 of the 2019 NRL Women's season, she made her debut for the Warriors, scoring a try in a 16–12 win over the Sydney Roosters.

In October 2019, she was a member of New Zealand's 2019 Rugby League World Cup 9s-winning squad.

On 1 December 2021, Poko signed with the Newcastle Knights to be a part of their inaugural NRLW squad.

In round 1 of the delayed 2021 NRL Women's season, Poko made her club debut for the Knights against the Parramatta Eels. She played in 5 matches for the Knights, before parting ways with the club at the end of the season.

Rugby union 
Poko signed with Matatū in the Super Rugby Aupiki competition for the 2023 season.

References

External links
Newcastle Knights profile
NRL profile

1995 births
Living people
New Zealand sportspeople of Cook Island descent
New Zealand female rugby league players
New Zealand women's national rugby league team players
Rugby league halfbacks
Rugby league five-eighths
Rugby league locks
New Zealand Warriors (NRLW) players
Newcastle Knights (NRLW) players